Pierre Pastorelli (24 March 1910 – 4 December 1981) was a French racing cyclist. He rode in the 1933 Tour de France.

References

1910 births
1981 deaths
French male cyclists
Place of birth missing